Notre-Dame-des-Champs  may refer to:

Our Lady of the Fields
Notre-Dame-des-Champs, Paris
Notre-Dame-des-Champs (Paris Métro)
Notre-Dame-des-Champs, Ontario